Incitec Pivot Ltd. is an Australian multinational corporation that manufactures fertiliser, explosives chemicals, and mining service.  Incitec Pivot is the largest supplier of fertilisers in Australia; the largest supplier of explosives products and services in North America; and the second largest supplier of explosives products and services in the world.  The company began trading on the ASX on 30 July 2003 having been formed as the result of a merger between Incitec Fertilizers and the Pivot group, and substantially expanded with the acquisition of Southern Cross Fertilisers in 2006 and Dyno Nobel in 2008.

Incitec Pivot has approximately 5,000 employees and operates in the United States, Canada, Mexico, and Australia. In 2005, the company struck a deal with the Government of Nauru to re-develop the country's phosphate mining industry, which had fallen into disrepair. The company invested $5 million to facilities and machinery, and phosphate mining resumed in late 2006.

Incitec Pivot has based a large part of its fertilizer production on imports of phosphate rock from Western Sahara, a territory which has been occupied by Morocco since 1975. Since such imports are considered in violation of international law, Incitec Pivot has been blacklisted from portfolios of several ethical investors including the United Methodist Church, Danske Bank, Storebrand, KLP, and the national pension funds of Sweden and Luxembourg.

References

External links 
 Official Incitec Pivot Website
 ABC Landline - Pacific Paydirt
 Official Dyno Nobel Website
 Official Incitec Pivot Fertilisers Website

Companies based in Melbourne
Mining companies of Australia
Companies listed on the Australian Securities Exchange
Manufacturing companies of Australia